St. Jean Baptiste High School is an American all-female, private, Roman Catholic high school, located on the Upper East Side of the Manhattan borough of New York City, New York. 

It is administered by the Congregation of Notre Dame of Montreal and located within the Roman Catholic Archdiocese of New York.

References

External links
 , the school's official website

1929 establishments in New York City
Educational institutions established in 1929
Girls' schools in New York City
Roman Catholic secondary schools in Manhattan
Upper East Side